Donovan Winter (1933 – 6 February 2015) was a British film director, actor and writer. He was born to Irish parents in London in 1933 and died on 6 February 2015 in the UK aged 82.

Select credits
The Trunk (1961)
World Without Shame (1962)
Come Back Peter (1969)
Sunday in the Park (1970)
Escort Girls (1974)
The Deadly Females (1976)
Give Us Tomorrow (1978)

References

External links
 

2015 deaths
English people of Irish descent
Film directors from London
1933 births
English film actors
English screenwriters
Male actors from London
Writers from London